Sacred Heart Convent School is an English language Catholic education private school for girls run by Apostolic Carmelite nuns in the city of Jamshedpur, India. It is registered under the Indian Societies Registration Act of 1860 under the title 'The Apostolic Carmel Educational Society'.

The school has grades from kindergarten to 12th. There are two kindergarten levels, both aimed at preparing the girls for school, the first being similar to a playschool rather than emphasising intellectual achievement.

Admissions
Students are admitted at the beginning of the school year, in mid-March.

Academics
Computer science is taught as a compulsory subject until grade nine, where students can choose to continue with it or to choose another stream of subjects. The school is equipped with a lab for computer literacy and programming courses. The computer and basic science courses offered at the school include GW-BASIC; Java (using the BlueJ IDE); and Logo. C++ is an optional course for the Plus Two students wishing to study computer science in college. The standard Chemistry, Physics and Biology courses are offered as part of the science curriculum.

The arts and sciences offering at the school are mathematics (covering geometry, algebra and the calculus); English; Hindi, Sanskrit; geography; environmental science; home economics; political science; commerce; economics; and history.

As students move from 9th grade to 12th grade, they are allowed more freedom in choosing their classes; they typically opt for a science or commerce related curriculum to facilitate their entrance into college.

Many students struggle with the I.C.S.E. exams, so the National Institute of Open Schooling (NIOS) was introduced. This is a program that allows weaker students to prepare for their examination and thus increases their chances of success. Boys and girls of Jamshedpur and other districts have registered for the examination through this school.

Student life

Athletics
Track sports include 100 m, 200 m, 400 m, 800 m, 4X100 m Relay and 100 m hurdles and the field events are discus throw, javelin throw, and shot put. Most of the students take part in track and field – it is one of the most popular sports at the school.

The basketball teams have represented the city and the state at district and national level tournaments. Football is practised for an hour each morning. Handball is practised at the Handball Court of JRD Tata Sports Complex adjacent to its premises. The school has a Kho Kho team. Volleyball practices are held in the morning, for one hour, in anticipation of the Annual Volleyball Tournament.

Karate in the Matsubayashi Shorin-ryu style is offered by qualified senseis to promote skills in self-defence as well as to increase the self-esteem and physical fitness of the girls.

Competitions
School contests include the nationwide quiz-type competitions, the QUANTA, a contest for science, mathematics, astronomy and computer science; the Fountainhead Essay Contest; the Cadbury Bournvita Quiz Contest; and essay and short story competitions for The Telegraph (the local newspaper) are offered throughout the year.

School uniform
The school uniform is worn at all times. The uniform colours are mainly blue and white.

The blue pleated skirt with white blouse are the central items, with an optional maroon sweater for winter wear. The white blouse has the school logo emblazoned on the left pocket.

11th and 12th grade students wear full-sleeved white shirts with a blue vest and blue pleated skirt. Ties are worn from 31 October to 31 March, and black blazers are worn during winter.

Black shoes are worn with the uniform and white keds during sports.

The band uniform is made of white straight skirts and white shirts with red rims.

Principals
 Sister Cleopha (1945–1948)
 Sister Mary Joan (1948–1952)
 Sister Cleopha (1952–1955)
 Sister Mary Denise (1955–1958)
 Sister Mary Digna (1958–1961)
 Sister Vera (1961–1966)
 Sister Veronique (1966–1972)
 Sister Yvette (1972–1973)
 Sister Marie Anne (1973–1974)
 Sister Marie Eugene (1974–1978)
 Sister Veronique (1978–1981)
 Sister Norella (1981–1986)
 Sister Flavian (1986–1998)
 Sister Teresita Mary (1998–2014)
 Sister Mridula (2014–2019)
 Sister Rashmita (2019–present)

Alumni association
The Association of Sacred Heart Alumni (ASHA) was founded in 1995 by Sister Flavian. Among the activities and services provided to the community and school by ASHA are counselling to help students to receive guidance on careers and personal problems; inviting ex-students for career counselling and to share their experiences; conducting the blood drives for cancer patients; raising funds for the cancer hospital and the old age home; conducting spoken English classes are given for non-native speakers; operating a book store on the school premises; and volunteering at the Samaria Ashram (leper colony).

See also
Education in India
Literacy in India
List of schools in India

References

External links
 

Carmelite educational institutions
Catholic secondary schools in India
Christian schools in Jharkhand
Girls' schools in Jharkhand
High schools and secondary schools in Jharkhand
Education in Jamshedpur
Educational institutions established in 1945
1945 establishments in India